Jodidar is a 1997 Indian Hindi-language fantasy film directed by T. L. V. Prasad, starring Mithun Chakraborty, Raasi, Bindushree, Aditya Pancholi and Prem Chopra. The film is a remake of the Telugu film Rajendrudu Gajendrudu.

Plot synopsis
Ganesh, an elephant, watches his master being killed by three poachers. After many years, Ganesh is able to identify the killers while being in the service of a new master, Munna.

Cast
Mithun Chakraborty as Munna "Captain"
Raasi as Landlord's daughter Manthra
Bindushree as Salesman's wife
Aditya Pancholi as Forest Officer
Prem Chopra as Landlord
Shama Deshpande as Landlord's wife
Puneet Issar as Poacher
Johnny Lever as Agarbatti / Pens / Bangles / Sarees salesman
Anjana Mumtaz as Munna's mother / Savita
Paintal as Munna's friend
Vishwajeet Pradhan as Poacher's 2nd brother
Tej Sapru as Poacher's 1st brother

Music

External links

References

1997 films
1990s Hindi-language films
Mithun's Dream Factory films
Films shot in Ooty
Films directed by T. L. V. Prasad
Films scored by Bappi Lahiri
Hindi remakes of Telugu films
Indian fantasy drama films